Saeng-arun Bunyu is a Thai female singer from Isan area. She was one of the popular and prolific  artists in the Mor lam (Thai country) and Luk thung (Thai pop-country) genres between 1994–2009. She was a member of Mor lam band Sieng Isan (เสียงอีสาน).

Life and music career
She has a nickname Tong (ต๋อง), but Sieng Isan's fan club call her Orn (อร). She was born on 28 November 1975, in Kalasin Province. She was introduced to stage in 1994 by a member of Sieng Isan. She was a main singer for Sieng Isan, with Maithai Huajaisilp and Lookphrae Uraiporn.

In 1997, she released an album in a mor lam group See Sao Dao Rung with Jakkajan Daoprai, Rerai Dao-Isan, and Pandam Khamkhoon.

In 2001, she was popularised by songs Kor Moon Mark Mai Yark Rak and Rak Phang Lang Songkran, written by Dao Bandon. In 2017, the song Kor Moon Mark Mai Yark Rak was covered by Dalar Thanyaporn.

Retirement
In 2009, she retired from entertainment because of a stroke, and was treated in her birthplace.

References

1975 births
Living people
Saeng-arun Bunyu
Saeng-arun Bunyu
Saeng-arun Bunyu
Saeng-arun Bunyu